Mothey mandal is one of the 23 mandals in Suryapet district of the Indian state of Telangana. It is under the administration of Suryapet revenue division with its headquarters at Mothey. It is bounded by Nadigudem Mandal towards South, Chivvemla Mandal towards west, Munagala mandal towards South, Atmakur(S) Mandal towards west and Khammam district towards east.

Demographics
Mothey mandal is having a population of 42,680 living in 10,095 Houses. Males are 21,607 and Females are 21,073. Singarneni Palle is the smallest Village and Sirikonda is the biggest Village in the mandal.

Villages 
 census of India, the mandal has 17 settlements.
The settlements in the mandal are listed below:

Notes
(†) Mandal headquarter

References

Mandals in Suryapet district